Escambia County is a county located in the south central portion of the U.S. state of Alabama. As of the 2020 census, the population was 36,757. Its county seat is Brewton.

Escambia County is coextensive with the Atmore, AL Micropolitan Statistical Area; which is itself a constituent part of the larger Pensacola-Ferry Pass, FL-AL Combined Statistical Area.

The county is the base of the state's only federally recognized Native American tribe, the Poarch Band of Creek Indians. They have developed gaming casinos and a hotel on their reservation here, but also a much larger business extending to locations in other states and the Caribbean.

Etymology
The name "Escambia" may have been derived from the Creek name Shambia, meaning "clearwater", or the Choctaw word for "cane-brake" or "reed-brake".

History

Historic American Indian tribes in the area included the Muskogean-speaking Creek, Choctaw, and Alabama, who had inhabited the lands for centuries and had many settlements. The former two tribes were among those in the Southeast whom the European-American settlers called the Five Civilized Tribes, as they adopted some European-American cultural ways. Many of their members had close working relationships with traders and settlers moving into the area in the early 19th century. Most of these nations were forced to cede their lands to the United States and to remove in the 1830s to Indian Territory west of the Mississippi River.

Escambia County was organized and established after the American Civil War, on December 10, 1868, during the Reconstruction era. The state legislature created it from parts of Baldwin and Conecuh counties, to the west and north, respectively. The area was part of the coastal plain. It was largely agricultural into the 20th century.

The county is subject to heavy winds and rains due to seasonal hurricanes. In September 1979, the county was declared a disaster area due to damage from Hurricane Frederic. It was declared a disaster area again in September 2004 due to damage from Hurricane Ivan.

In the 20th century, the Poarch Band of Creek Indians organized to gain recognition as a tribe, and established a government under a written constitution. It had control of some lands that were taken into trust on their behalf by the federal government as part of the federal recognition process. It is the only federally recognized tribe in the state. Since the late 20th century, they have developed three gaming resorts to generate revenues for tribal health and welfare.

In addition, Alabama has recognized nine tribes, generally descendants of Choctaw, Creek, and Cherokee Native Americans who had historically lived here.

Geography

Major highways
 Interstate 65
 U.S. Highway 29
 U.S. Highway 31
 State Route 21
 State Route 41
 State Route 113

Adjacent counties
Conecuh County (north)
Covington County (east)
Okaloosa County, Florida (southeast)
Santa Rosa County, Florida (south)
Escambia County, Florida (southwest) 
Baldwin County (west)
Monroe County (northwest)

Escambia County in Alabama and Escambia County in Florida are two of 22 counties or parishes in the United States with the same name to border each other across state lines.

National protected area
 Conecuh National Forest (part)

Demographics

2020

As of the 2020 United States census, there were 36,757 people, 13,089 households, and 8,019 families residing in the county.

2010
According to the 2010 United States Census:

62.1% White
31.9% Black
4.4% Native American
0.2% Asian 
0.0% Native Hawaiian or Pacific Islander 
1.5% Two or more races
1.9% Hispanic or Latino (of any race)

As of 2012 the largest self-reported ancestry groups in Escambia County were:
30.5% English
12.1% "American"
9.9% Irish

2000
As of the census of 2000, there were 38,440 people, 14,297 households, and 10,093 families residing in the county.  The population density was 41 people per square mile (16/km2).  There were 16,544 housing units at an average density of 18 per square mile (7/km2).  The racial makeup of the county was 64.40% White, 30.79% Black or African American, 3.01% Native American, 0.24% Asian, 0.03% Pacific Islander, 0.40% from other races, and 1.13% from two or more races.  0.99% of the population were Hispanic or Latino of any race.

There were 14,297 households, out of which 32.00% had children under the age of 18 living with them, 51.70% were married couples living together, 15.10% had a female householder with no husband present, and 29.40% were non-families. 26.40% of all households were made up of individuals, and 11.40% had someone living alone who was 65 years of age or older.  The average household size was 2.48 and the average family size was 2.99.

In the county, the population was spread out, with 24.10% under the age of 18, 9.70% from 18 to 24, 28.90% from 25 to 44, 23.70% from 45 to 64, and 13.60% who were 65 years of age or older.  The median age was 37 years. For every 100 females there were 102.70 males.  For every 100 females age 18 and over, there were 102.70 males.

The median income for a household in the county was $28,319, and the median income for a family was $36,086. Males had a median income of $30,632 versus $18,091 for females. The per capita income for the county was $14,396.  About 15.20% of families and 20.90% of the population were below the poverty line, including 24.70% of those under age 18 and 17.80% of those age 65 or over.

Government and infrastructure
Holman has a male death row and the State of Alabama execution chamber. The city of Atmore annexed both prisons in 2008.

Escambia County is reliably Republican at the presidential level. The last Democrat to win the county in a presidential election is Jimmy Carter, who won it by a majority in 1976.

Communities

Cities
Atmore
Brewton (county seat)
East Brewton

Towns
Flomaton
Pollard
Riverview

Unincorporated communities

 Canoe 
 Dixonville 
 Foshee
 Freemanville
 Huxford
 McCullough
 Nokomis
 Spring Hill
 Wahl

Former town
 Alco

Indian reservation
 Poarch Creek Indian Reservation

Education
The two school districts are Brewton City School District (City of Brewton) and Escambia County School District (all other locations).

Historic sites
Escambia County has two sites listed on the National Register of Historic Places, the Brewton Historic Commercial District and the Commercial Hotel-Hart Hotel.

Secession proposal
Perdido County, Alabama would contain northern Baldwin County, divided by a straight line extending westward from the northwestern tip of Florida, and western Escambia County, west of Big Escambia Creek.  (The Flomaton area is excluded via a prominent power line easement, from Big Escambia Creek to the Florida state line.)  The southwestern tip of Conecuh County, also west of Big Escambia Creek, may be included as well.  The headwaters of the Perdido River rise near the center of this proposed county.  The Perdido County seat would be Atmore.  The county has been proposed by city of Atmore backers, who believe that their growing city of over 10,000 residents should be a county seat.  Furthermore, county backers believe that Atmore belongs in the Mobile-Daphne-Fairhope metropolitan combined statistical area, which would become much more likely within its own exurban-leaning county.  Brewton would remain the county seat of rural-leaning Escambia County.  In addition to the incorporated city of Atmore, Perdido County would include the unincorporated communities of Blacksher, Canoe, Freemanville, Huxford, Nokomis, Perdido and Tensaw.

Notable residents
 Esther Blake (1897–1979), the first woman in the United States Air Force.

See also

National Register of Historic Places listings in Escambia County, Alabama
Properties on the Alabama Register of Landmarks and Heritage in Escambia County, Alabama

References

External links
 Escambia County Industrial Development Authority
 Coastal Gateway Regional Economic Development Alliance
 Escambia County history
 Escambia County map of roads/towns (map © 2007 Univ. of Alabama).
 The Brewton Standard
 South Alabama Community Website

 

Alabama placenames of Native American origin
 
1868 establishments in Alabama
Populated places established in 1868